Flight 701 may refer to:

Ariana Afghan Airlines Flight 701, crashed on 5 January 1969
Air Littoral Flight 701, crashed on 30 July 1997

0701